The 1991–92 Memphis State Tigers men's basketball team represented Memphis State University as a member of the Great Midwest Conference during the 1991–92 NCAA Division I men's basketball season. The Tigers were led by head coach Larry Finch and played their home games at the Pyramid Arena in Memphis, Tennessee.

The Tigers received an at-large bid to the 1992 NCAA tournament as No. 6 seed in the Midwest region. After defeating No. 11 seed Pepperdine, No. 3 seed Arkansas, and No. 7 seed Georgia Tech, Memphis State fell to No. 4 seed Cincinnati for the fourth time in the Midwest Regional final. The team finished with a 23–11 record (5–5 Great Midwest).

Roster

Schedule and results

|-
!colspan=9 style= | Regular season

|-
!colspan=9 style= | Great Midwest Conference Tournament

|-
!colspan=9 style= | NCAA Tournament

Rankings

Awards and honors
Penny Hardaway – GMC Player of the Year

References

Memphis Tigers men's basketball seasons
Memphis State
Memphis State
1992 in sports in Tennessee
1991 in sports in Tennessee